The Chronicles of Melanie is a 2016 Latvian biographical drama film directed by Viesturs Kairišs, starring Sabine Timoteo. The film is based on the real life of Melānija Vanaga. It was produced by Latvia's Mistrus Media and co-produced by the Czech Republic's 8Heads Productions and Finland's Inland Film Company.

Two weeks after its domestic release on November 1 the film was watched by 35,000 people, making it the most-watched Latvian film of 2016.

Plot
Melānija and her son are forcefully moved from their home in Latvia to a slave camp in Siberia as part of the June deportation in 1941. For the next 16 years, she retains her will to live by writing letters to her husband, whose destiny she knows nothing about.

Cast
 Sabine Timoteo as Melānija
 Edvīns Mekšs as Andrejs
 Ivars Krasts as Aleksandrs
 Guna Zariņa as Katrīna
 Maija Doveika as Vilma
 Viktors Nemecs as Ampalov
 Erwin Leder as Jakob
 Evija Rudzīte as Biruta
 Baiba Broka as Anna
 Kirill Zaytsev (Latvian: Kirils Zaicevs) as Lieutenant of the People's Commissariat of Internal Affairs
 Astrīda Kairiša as Melānija's mother
 Lilita Ozoliņa as deported woman
 Ģirts Krūmiņš as Katrīna's husband Kārlis
 Evija Martinsone as opera soloist

Awards
The Chronicles of Melanie received the award for best cinematography at the 2016 Tallinn Black Nights Film Festival. It was selected as the Latvian entry for the Best Foreign Language Film at the 90th Academy Awards, but it was not nominated.

In the 2017 Latvian film festival Lielais Kristaps The Chronicles of Melanie won the award as the Best feature film, while members of the film crew received awards as the Best Director, Best Actress, Best Design and Best Costume Design.

Reception
Wendy Ide of Screen Daily described the film as "a potent account of the human cost of Soviet ethnic cleansing in the Baltic region". She compared it to the 2014 Estonian film In the Crosswind, which also is about a woman subjected to the June deportation, and wrote that The Chronicles of Melanie is "less experimental in approach". Ide wrote: "The distorted sound creates a sense of delirium; the painfully slow movements of the malnourished women gives the film a nightmarish quality. Time slows down, both for the exiled Latvian women and also, at times, for the audience. It all amounts to a challenging viewing experience."

See also
 Population transfer in the Soviet Union
 List of submissions to the 90th Academy Awards for Best Foreign Language Film
 List of Latvian submissions for the Academy Award for Best Foreign Language Film

References

External links 
 

2016 films
2016 biographical drama films
Films about Soviet repression
Films set in 1941
Films set in Latvia
Films set in Siberia
Latvian-language films
Latvian drama films
2010s historical drama films
2016 drama films
Biographical films about writers
Baltic states World War II films